Dodge Mansion may refer to:

Dodge Mansion (Grosse Point Farms, Michigan), listed on the National Register of Historic Places in Wayne County, Michigan
Dodge Mansion (Lansing, Michigan), listed on the National Register of Historic Places in Ingham County, Michigan

See also
Dodge House (disambiguation)